Bernard de Dryver (born 19 September 1952) is a racing driver from Belgium. He was born in Brussels. He entered two World Championship Formula One Grands Prix, the Belgian Grand Prix in 1977 and 1978. In 1977 he entered a non-works March, but failed to make the grid. The following year he entered a privately run Ensign but did not qualify for official practice.

He raced a full season in the Aurora UK Formula One Championship in 1979, driving a Fittipaldi, scoring a number of podiums and finishing fourth in the championship.

He is still involved in motor sport, most recently in GT Racing.

Racing record

Complete European Formula Two Championship results
(key) (Races in bold indicate pole position; races in italics indicate fastest lap)

Complete Formula One World Championship results
(key)

Complete International Formula 3000 results
(key) (Races in bold indicate pole position; races in italics indicate fastest lap.)

Complete British GT Championship results
(key) (Races in bold indicate pole position) (Races in italics indicate fastest lap)

References
Profile at oldracingcars.com

1952 births
Living people
Belgian racing drivers
Belgian Formula One drivers
European Formula Two Championship drivers
International Formula 3000 drivers
24 Hours of Le Mans drivers
British Formula One Racing Team Formula One drivers
British Formula One Championship drivers
World Sportscar Championship drivers
24 Hours of Spa drivers
Racing drivers from Brussels
British GT Championship drivers